Diceratias is a genus of double anglers with three recognized species as of 2012:

Species
 Diceratias bispinosus Günther, 1887 (Two-rod anglerfish)
 Diceratias pileatus Uwate, 1979
 Diceratias trilobus Balushkin & Fedorov, 1986

References

Diceratiidae
Marine fish genera
Taxa named by Albert Günther